Paweł Lubina (22 December 1896 – 6 December 1977) was a Polish footballer. He played in two matches for the Poland national football team from 1926 to 1927.

References

External links
 

1896 births
1977 deaths
Polish footballers
Poland international footballers
Place of birth missing
Association footballers not categorized by position